Arnaud Rebotini is a French musician. He is a member of the band Black Strobe, which released their debut album Burn Your Own Church in 2007.

He has previously been a member of the death metal band Post Mortum, which later became Swamp.

In 1998, he participated to the album One Trip / One Noise by Noir Desir with the track "Lazy (Zend Avesta mix)".

In 2000, he released an experimental pop album Organique under the pseudonym of Zend Avesta.

In late 2008 he released Music Components with Citizen Records. 
In 2009 he released a remix version, Music Components Rev2.

In 2010 he received the "Artist Qwartz" award at the 6th edition of the Qwartz Electronic Music Awards.

In 2011 he released the album Someone Gave Me Religion with Blackstrobe Records. The album was promoted by two EPs, 
Personal Dictator EP and All You Need Is Techno EP.

Equipment 
 Roland : Roland Alpha Juno 2, Roland Juno-60, Roland JX-3P, Roland JX-8P, Roland SH-101, Roland TB-303, Roland TR-707, Roland TR-808, Roland TR-909
 Korg Mono/Poly
 ARP Odyssey
 Sequential Circuits Pro-One
 E-mu SP-1200

Discography

Music Components (CDZ023 Citizen Records, 2008)
 "The Spirit of Boogie"
 "Un Cheval d’Orgueil"
 "1314"
 "Cm"
 "The Swamp Waltz"
 "Horns of Innocence"
 "Conakry Filter Sweep"
 "777"
 "Decade of Aggression"
 "MnII"

 Music Components Rev2 (CDZ030 Citizen Records, 2009)
 "The Spirit of Boogie" by Märtini Brös
 "Un Cheval D'Orgueil" by Donovan
 "1314" by Acid Washed
 "Cm" by Chloé
 "The Swamp Waltz" by Steve Moore
 "Horns of Innocence" by Xaver Naudascher
 "Conakry Filter Sweep" by Black Strobe
 "777" by Discodéine
 "Decade of Aggression" by Jesper Dahlback
 "Mnll" by SomethingALaMode

 Personal Dictator EP (BSR001 Blackstrobe Records, 2011)
 "Personal Dictator" (12" mix)
 "Personal Dictator" (Mixhell Remix)
 "Personal Dictator" (Motor Remix)
 "Personal Dictator" (The Hacker Remix)
 "Twilight of Gods"

 All You Need Is Techno EP (BSR002 Blackstrobe Records, 2011)
 "All You Need Is Techno" (909 Remix)
 "All You Need Is Techno" (Feadz Remix)
 "All You Need Is Techno" (Gesaffelstein Remix)
 "All You Need Is Techno"
 "State Violence State Control"

 Someone Gave Me Religion (BSR003 Blackstrobe Records, 2011)
 "The First Thirteen Minutes of Love"
 "Another Time, Another Place"
 "Personal Dictator"
 "Another Dictator"
 "Echoes"
 "All You Need Is Techno"
 "Who’s GonnaPlayThisOldMachine?"
 "Extreme Conditions Demand Extreme Responses"
 "The Choir of the Dead Lovers"
 "Sunny Sunday Blues" (Digital Only)

 Another Time, Another Place EP (BSR004 Blackstrobe Records, 2011)
 "Another Time, Another Place" (Radio Edit)
 "Wardance"
 "Another Time, Another Place" (Gucci Vump Remix)
 "Another Time, Another Place" (Acid Washed Remix)
 "Another Time, Another Place" (Mustang Remix)
 "The First Thirteen Minutes of Love" (Turzi Remix)

Notes

References

External links

 Official website

1970 births
Living people
21st-century French singers
21st-century French male singers